
Year 883 (DCCCLXXXIII) was a common year starting on Tuesday (link will display the full calendar) of the Julian calendar.

Events 
 By place 
 Europe 
 Spring – Viking raiders ravage Flanders, and sack the abbey at Saint-Quentin. King Carloman II blocks their passage at Laviers, which had been on the banks of the Somme. Meanwhile, Vikings enter the Rhine, but are turned back by Henry of Franconia (possibly a margrave of Saxony). They over-winter at Duisburg.
 King Charles the Fat travels to Nonantola (Northern Italy), where he meets Pope Marinus I. He receives complaints of Guy II of Spoleto, who is the official "protector" of Rome, and invades the Papal States. King Charles orders Guy to appear before a tribunal.
 Guy II of Spoleto begins a revolt, and assembles an army supported with Arab auxiliaries. King Charles the Fat sends Berengar of Friuli with an expeditionary force to deprive him of Spoleto. An epidemic ravages Berengar's army, and forces them to retire.
 Svatopluk I, ruler (knyaz) of Great Moravia, conquers Lower Pannonia (today's Southwestern Hungary and Northern Croatia), during the succession strife in the East Frankish Kingdom (approximate date).
 The first historic document (written by Regino of Prüm) mentions Duisburg.

 Arabian Empire 
 The Zanj Rebellion: Abbasid general Al-Muwaffaq brings in Egyptian forces, to help him in his two-year siege of the Zanj capital Mukhtara. He captures the city, and crushes the revolt that has devastated Chaldea (modern Iraq) since 869.
 September 11 – Yazaman al-Khadim, Abbasid governor of Tarsus, routs a Byzantine army under general Kesta Styppiotes, in a night attack. According to Arab chroniclers, 70,000 out of 100,000 Byzantine troops are killed.

Births 
 Burchard II, duke of Swabia (or 884)
 Hyogong, king of Silla (Korea) (d. 912)
 Ibn Masarra, Muslim ascetic and scholar (d. 931)
 Zhao Jiliang, chancellor of Later Shu (d. 946)
 Zhao Tingyin, Chinese general (d. 949)

Deaths 
 September 11 – Kesta Styppiotes, Byzantine general
 Ansegisus, archbishop of Sens (or 879)
 Anselm of Farfa, Frankish abbot (approximate date)
 Bertharius, Benedictine abbot and poet
 Bertulf, archbishop of Trier
 Dawud al-Zahiri, Muslim scholar (or 884)
 Eochocán mac Áedo, king of Ulaid (Ireland)
 Froila, Galician bishop
 Guy II, duke of Spoleto
 Han Jian, Chinese warlord
 Ignatius II, patriarch of Antioch
 Pi Rixiu, Chinese poet
 Wang Jingchong, Chinese governor (b. 847)
 Yang Fuguang, Chinese general (b. 842)

References